The 1911 Open Championship was the 51st Open Championship, held 26–30 June at Royal St George's Golf Club in Sandwich, England. Harry Vardon won the Championship for the fifth time in a playoff over Arnaud Massy, the 1907 champion.

There was no qualifying event and with 226 entries it was not possible for all the players to play 18 holes on the same day. The players were therefore divided into three "sections," with the first 36 holes played over three days. Sections A and B played their first rounds on Monday, while section C played on Tuesday morning. Section A played their second rounds that afternoon, while sections B and C played their second rounds on Wednesday.

By the start of the first round, the number of participants had been reduced to 222, with four withdrawals. On Monday, Michael Moran of Section B had the best round at 72. On Tuesday morning, the players in Section C discovered that a number of the holes had been moved since the first day. Later in the day a letter of protest was drawn up by a group of professionals and presented to the authorities: "To the Committee of the Championship, 1911 -  Gentlemen, we the undersigned competitors at this Championship meeting respectfully protest against the alteration of the course during the qualifying (sic) rounds." Play was somewhat easier on the second morning and amateur Edward Blackwell led at 71, with  joining Moran with 72.

At the end of Tuesday, only Section A had completed 36 holes, and Ted Ray led at 148. The Committee replied to the professionals, "The Green Committee consider that in deciding to cut fresh holes each day they had adopted the best course possible under the terms of the competition, which were exceptional owing to the large entry, and though they regret that there was any dissatisfaction amongst the players, they decided that the protest could not be upheld." New holes were again cut on the third morning, so that Sections B and C played their second round to different holes to Section A.

The second round was completed on Wednesday evening, and George Duncan led the field at 144, four ahead of Ray, Taylor, and Vardon. The leading sixty players and ties advanced for the final 36 holes on Thursday; the cut was at 162 and 73 players advanced, with fifteen players on the number.

Duncan had a poor third round of 83 in the morning, which left Vardon with a three-shot lead over Sandy Herd, Taylor, and Massy.

Vardon was among the early starters in the afternoon and scored 80 for 303. Amateur Harold Hilton reached the turn in 33, but took 43 for the last nine and finished a shot behind. Massy needed a four at the difficult final hole to tie; he reached the green with two woods and two-putted to force a 36-hole playoff with Vardon on Friday.

Massy led the playoff after ten holes, but a six at the 14th and a disastrous seven at 17 put Vardon ahead by five after the first round. The lead extended to seven after 27 holes and ten after 34 holes. After Vardon reached the green in two at the 35th and Massy was in thick rough after two shots, Massy picked up his ball and conceded.

Coronation Match
The Championship was preceded by a "Coronation Match" between teams of amateurs and professionals at Royal St George's on Saturday 24 June. The match was in celebration of the coronation of George V on 22 June. The match consisted of 9 foursomes matches, each over 36 holes. Only one match went beyond the 33rd hole and resulted in a win for the amateurs at the

Course

Past champions in the field 

Source:

Did not enter: Jack White (1904)

Round summaries

First round
Monday, 26 June 1911 (morning, section A; afternoon, section B)
Tuesday, 27 June 1911 (morning, section C)

Source:

Second round
Tuesday, 27 June 1911 (afternoon, section A)
Wednesday, 28 June 1911 (morning, section B; afternoon, section C)

Source:

Third round
Thursday, 29 June 1911 (morning)

Source:

Final round
Thursday, 29 June 1911 (afternoon)

Source:

Playoff
Friday, 30 June 1911

Ten shots behind after 34 holes, Massy was in trouble on the 35th hole and conceded the match. Scores in the table below are after 34 holes.

Scorecards
Morning round

Afternoon round

Source:

References

External links
Royal St Georges 1911 (Official site)

The Open Championship
Golf tournaments in England
Open Championship
Open Championship
Open Championship